Athanas Mdamu (born 3 July 1998) is a Tanzanian football striker who plays for Alliance Academy.

References

1998 births
Living people
Tanzanian footballers
Tanzania international footballers
Alliance Academy F.C. players
Singida United F.C. players
F.C. Kariobangi Sharks players
Association football forwards
Tanzanian expatriate footballers
Expatriate footballers in Kenya
Tanzanian expatriate sportspeople in Kenya
Tanzanian Premier League players